Mustapha Madih (died 4 November 2018) was a Moroccan football manager.

References

1950s births
2018 deaths
Moroccan football managers
Morocco national football team managers
Hassania Agadir managers
AS FAR (football) managers